U.S. Route 13 (US 13) is a north–south U.S. highway established in 1926 that runs for  from Interstate 95 (I-95) just north of Fayetteville, North Carolina to US 1 in the northeastern suburbs of Philadelphia, Pennsylvania, in Morrisville. In all, it traverses five states in the Atlantic coastal plain region. It follows the Atlantic coast more closely than does the main north–south U.S. highway of the region, US 1. Due to this, its number is out of place on the general U.S. Route numbering grid, as it should be running west of US 11 but does not. Its routing is largely rural, the notable exceptions being the Hampton Roads area in Virginia and the northern end of the highway in Delaware and Pennsylvania. It is also notable for being the main thoroughfare for the Delmarva Peninsula and carrying the Chesapeake Bay Bridge–Tunnel to it in Virginia.

US 13's original plan in 1926 had the route serve no further south than the Delmarva Peninsula. However, it has been extended many times, connecting to the mainland via ferry service and eventually reaching North Carolina. This link across the mouth of the Chesapeake Bay became fixed in 1964 with a bridge-tunnel. The entire route on the Delmarva peninsula, except for a few sections in Accomack County, Virginia, has been dualized fully with four lanes, and further upgrades continue, such as a freeway section around the east side of Salisbury, Maryland.

Route description

|-
|NC
|185.52
|298.57
|-
|VA
|137.45
|221.20
|-
|MD
|42.01
|67.60
|-
|DE
|103.33 
|166.29
|-
|PA
|49.50
|79.66
|-
|Total
|517.81
|833.33
|}

North Carolina

US 13 runs southwest to northeast through the eastern part of North Carolina. It begins at I-95 near Fayetteville as a continuation of I-295 (Fayetteville Outer Loop) and heads northeast, intersecting US 421 in Spivey's Corner and US 701 in Newton Grove. It passes over I-40 without an interchange; access is provided via US 701 or NC 50. It then passes through the city of Goldsboro, where it intersects US 70 and US 117. US 13 continues northeast and shares a brief concurrency with US 264 before passing through the city of Greenville. US 13 then heads north from Greenville, following the limited-access US 64 east between Bethel and Williamston and US 17 north between Williamston and Windsor. US 13 then heads north from Windsor towards Ahoskie and intersects with NC 11. It then crosses US 158 in Gates before crossing the state line with Virginia.

Virginia

US 13 continues north, expanding to four lanes near Suffolk and diverges onto the Suffolk Bypass where it joins US 58 and US 460. Here, one of the many business routes of US 13 passes straight through the city as the bypass passes the city to the west. It continues through the Hampton Roads area on the Military Highway and continues north to the Chesapeake Bay Bridge–Tunnel, which the route uses to continue across the Chesapeake Bay to the Eastern Shore of Virginia. Here, US 13 is the main north–south route of the region, and connects to most cities and towns with four more business routes forming loops off the highway. North of New Church, US 13 crosses the state border into Maryland.

Maryland

US 13 passes through the lower Eastern Shore region of Maryland. It runs through Pocomoke City in Worcester County, where it meets the southern terminus of US 113. It continues north into Somerset County, where it passes through the town of Princess Anne. It then enters Wicomico County, where it bypasses the cities of Salisbury and Fruitland to the east on the limited-access Salisbury Bypass, with the former alignment signed as US 13 Business. On the northeastern part of the bypass, US 13 is concurrent with US 50, which bypasses Salisbury to the north. North of Salisbury, US 13 continues to the state line town of Delmar.

Delaware

US 13 runs through the entire north–south length of Delaware. It enters the state in Delmar and runs through western Sussex County, intersecting the western terminus of US 9 in Laurel and passing through the city of Seaford. It continues into Kent County and heads north towards the state capital of Dover. US 13 forms the commercial district of the city of Dover. Between Dover and Wilmington in New Castle County, US 13 is paralleled by the Delaware Route 1 freeway, portions of which are a toll road. It crosses the Chesapeake & Delaware Canal on the St. Georges Bridge. US 13 continues towards Wilmington, sharing a concurrency with US 40 in the New Castle area. It bypasses the heart of Wilmington to the east, with US 13 Business passing through the downtown area. US 13 parallels I-495 between Wilmington and the Pennsylvania border.

Pennsylvania

Upon entering the Commonwealth of Pennsylvania from Delaware, US 13 runs along the banks of the Delaware River parallel to I-95 through Delaware County. It then runs a southwest to northeast path through the city of Philadelphia. It traverses West Philadelphia on many one-way pairs and then passes by the Philadelphia Zoo. US 13 then runs through North Philadelphia and Northeast Philadelphia by following Hunting Park Avenue, the Roosevelt Boulevard (which is also US 1), and Frankford Avenue, where it crosses the Pennypack Creek on the oldest bridge in the United States. US 13 then enters Bucks County, again closely following I-95, the Delaware River and US 1. US 13 ends after an interchange with US 1 near Morrisville in Falls Township. The road continues north toward Yardley as Pine Grove Road.

History

The original 1925 U.S. highway plan, which never came to fruition, had provision for a US 13 in North Carolina. It would have started in Wilmington and run at least as far north as Elizabeth City, following what would become US 17. Although US 13 was signed in most northern states by the late 1920s, it would not reach North Carolina until the early 1950s.

The route was proposed as one of the first four-laned highways in the United States of America to Pierre S. du Pont by John J. Raskob so as to run from Wilmington, Delaware, to the state capital, Dover. Du Pont wanted a two-laned highway—the standard at the time, but Raskob suggested that with the growth and development of northern Delaware, there would be a future need for a four-laned one. Du Pont agreed and, to honor Raskob for his insight, sought to name the route after him. However, Raskob declined.

Major intersections
North Carolina
 in Eastover
 in Eastover
 in Spivey's Corner
 in Newton Grove
 in Mar-Mac. The highways travel concurrently to Goldsboro.
 in Goldsboro. The highways travel concurrently through the city.
 north of Snow Hill. The highways travel concurrently to south-southwest of Farmville.
 in Greenville
 north of Bethel. The highways travel concurrently to south-southeast of Williamston.
 south of Williamston. The highways travel concurrently to Windsor.
 northwest of Winton. The highways travel concurrently to northeast of Winton.
Virginia
 in Suffolk. The highways travel concurrently to Chesapeake.
 in Suffolk. The highways travel concurrently to Chesapeake.
 in Chesapeake.
 in Chesapeake
 in Chesapeake
 in Chesapeake
 in Norfolk
 in Norfolk
 in Norfolk
 in Virginia Beach
Maryland
 in Pocomoke City
 in Salisbury. The highways travel concurrently through the city.
Delaware
 northeast of Laurel
 in State Road. The highways travel concurrently to Wilmington Manor.
 in Wilmington Manor
 in Wilmington Manor
 south of Wilmington
 in Claymont
Pennsylvania
 in Chester
 in Philadelphia
 in Philadelphia. The highways travel concurrently through the city.
 in Bristol Township
 in Falls Township
Pine Grove Road in Falls Township

See also

Auxiliary routes
U.S. Route 113, the only surviving child route of US 13
U.S. Route 213, replaced by US 50 and MD 213

Special routes

References

External links

 Endpoints of U.S. Highway 13

 
13
Interstate 95